The 1970–71 season was Fussball Club Basel 1893's 77th season in their existence. It was their 25th consecutive season in the top flight of Swiss football after their promotion the season 1945–46. They played their home games in the St. Jakob Stadium.

Overview

Pre-season
For the sixth consecutive season Helmut Benthaus was player-manager. There were only very few changes in the squad. Bruno Michaud retired from active football after winning his third championship title. He had played 16 seasons in the Nationalliga A, 14 of these were with Basel and two with Lausanne-Sport. During his time with Basel Michaud played a total of 355 competitive games and scored 22 goals. Dieter Rüefli moved on to play for St. Gallen and Janos Konrad moved on to Vevey-Sports. In the other direction Edoardo Manzoni joined the squad on loan from Xamax. Benthaus did not want any other transfers and relied on young players who came up from the reserve team to help, when needed in the first team. Basel played a total of 55 matches during this season. 27 of these games were in the domestic league including the play-off for the championship. Three of these games were in the Swiss Cup, four were in the European Cup, five were in the Cup of the Alps and 16 were friendly matches. Of these 16 test games 13 were won and three were drawn. Five test matches were played at home and 11 played away.

Domestic league
14 teams contested in the 1970–71 Nationalliga A. These were the top 12 teams from the previous 1969–70 season and the two newly promoted teams Sion and Luzern. The championship was played in a double round robin. The champions would qualify for the 1971–72 European Cup and the last two teams in the league table at the end of the season were to be relegated. Basel won 18 of their 26 league games, drawing six, losing just twice, they scored 67 goals conceding 26. They finished the regular season level on points with Grasshopper Club Zürich and so these two teams had to contest a play-off game on 8 June 1971 to decide the title winners. Grasshopper won the play-off 4–3 after extra time. Walter Balmer was Basel's top goal scorer with 13 league goals and Karl Odermatt second top scorer with 12 league goals. Peter Wenger scored 10, Helmut Hauser managed 9 and Jürgen Sundermann scored 8 league goals. Bellinzona finished last and the table and were relegated. Sion and Fribourg, level on points, were both second last and thus they had to have a play-off against relegation. Sion won 1–0, so Fribourg were relegated.

Swiss Cup
On 1 November 1969 Basel started in the Swiss Cup in the round of 32 with a 5–1 home win against CS Chênois. In the round of 16 played on 29 November Basel had a home match against Bellinzona which was won 2–0. In the quarter-final, played on 28 February 1971, Basel had an away tie against Mendrisiostar (after club merger later renamed FC Mendrisio-Stabio). However, this was lost 0–2 after extra time. Servette won the cup competition at the end of the season, winning the final at the Wankdorf Stadium 2–0 against Lugano.

European Cup
In the European Cup Basel were drawn against Spartak Moscow. The first leg, which was played on 16 September 1970 away from home, was lost 2–3 with Odermatt and Benthaus scoring for the guests during the last 12 minutes, after they had gone three down with just a quarter of an hour left to play. In the second leg played in the St. Jakob Stadium Basel won 2–1, the goals being scored by Siegenthaler und Walter Balmer. Thus the tie ended 4–4 on aggregate. Basel won on away goals and advanced to the second round. Here they were drawn against Ajax, first away from home, but they suffered a 0–3 defeat. The second leg at home also ended with a defeat, 1–2, despite the fact that Odermatt put Basel one up with a penalty after 36 minutes.

Cup of the Alps
In the 1970 Cup of the Alps Basel were in the Swiss Group together with Lugano, Young Boys and Zürich.
They played against each of the four Italian teams Fiorentina, Lazio, Sampdoria and Bari. Basel won the Swiss group and in the final they faced and beat Fiorentina 3–2.

Players 

 
 
 

 
 

 
 
 
 
 
 
 

 

Players who left the squad

Results 
Legend

Friendly matches

Pre-season

Winter break

Nationalliga

League matches

League standings

Championship play-off

Swiss Cup

European Cup 

First round

Spartak Moscow 4–4 Basel on aggregate. Basel won on away goals.

Second round

Ajax won 5–1 on aggregate.

Coppa delle Alpi

Matches

Standings Swiss teams

Final

See also 
 History of FC Basel
 List of FC Basel players
 List of FC Basel seasons

References

Sources 
 Rotblau: Jahrbuch Saison 2015/2016. Publisher: FC Basel Marketing AG. 
 Die ersten 125 Jahre. Publisher: Josef Zindel im Friedrich Reinhardt Verlag, Basel. 
 Verein "Basler Fussballarchiv" Homepage
 Switzerland 1970–71 at RSSSF

External links 
 FC Basel official site

FC Basel seasons
Basel